Dykehead Football Club was a football club based in the Dykehead area of Shotts, playing their home games at Parkside. The club were members of the Scottish Football League Third Division.

The early history of the club is somewhat shrouded in mystery, although they were formed in 1880 but did not register with the Scottish Football Association until four years later. The club briefly competed in the Scottish Football Alliance, as well as the Eastern Football League, the Inter County Football League and the Scottish Football Union, which they won in 1912–13.

They eventually ended up in the Western League, which was incorporated by the Scottish Football League as its new Third Division for the 1923–24 season. Dykehead lasted the Division's three seasons, finishing 5th, 12th and 4th, but were not retained by the League after the 1925–26 season. Dykehead spent the following season in the Scottish Football Alliance (now much reduced in status) and then spent 1927-28 in the Provincial League. In 1928 Dykehead were wound up.

They played their home games at Dykehead Park, Youngston Park, Craigmillar Park and Parkside. Their colours were black and white.

Former players

1. Players that have played/managed in the Football League or any foreign equivalent to this level (i.e. fully professional league).
2. Players with full international caps.
3. Players that hold a club record or have captained the club.
 Tommy Davidson
 Ed McLaine

References

External links
Dykehead Historical Kits

 
Defunct football clubs in Scotland
Association football clubs established in 1880
Association football clubs disestablished in 1928
Football in North Lanarkshire
Scottish Football League teams
1880 establishments in Scotland
1928 disestablishments in Scotland
Shotts